Placida is an unincorporated community in Charlotte County, Florida, United States. It is located near where County Road 771 becomes County Road 775, and the Coral Creek meets Gasparilla Sound.

Placida is part of the Sarasota-Bradenton-Punta Gorda Combined Statistical Area. The ZIP Code for Placida is 33946.

Geography
Placida is located at  (26.83194, -82.265). Placida has an elevation of 3 feet.

References

Unincorporated communities in Charlotte County, Florida
Unincorporated communities in Florida
Populated places on the Intracoastal Waterway in Florida